Srulik is a cartoon character symbolizing Israel. The character was created in 1956 by the Israeli cartoonist Kariel Gardosh, known by his pen name Dosh.

The cartoon appeared for many years in the newspaper Maariv. Yosef Lapid, Dosh's colleague on the editorial board of Maariv, described  Srulik as an icon of Israel in the same way that Marianne and Uncle Sam were respectively icons of France and the United States. Srulik has been a common nickname in Israel for boys named "Yisrael" ("Israel", from ), although by the 2000's it had become an outdated nickname.

Description
Srulik is generally depicted as a young man wearing a tembel hat, Biblical sandals, and khaki shorts. Srulik is a pioneering Zionist, a lover of the land of Israel and its soil, a dedicated farmer who in time of need puts on a uniform and goes out to defend the state of Israel. Dosh drew Srulik in cartoons on current events for Maariv, and also for various "specials" and occasions of the young state. During wartime, Srulik put on a uniform and was drafted to raise the national morale.

Symbolism
Many have pointed out Srulik's function as an antithesis of the antisemitic caricatures which appeared in Der Stürmer and other European and Arab journals. As against the stereotype of the weak or cunning Jew that was propagated by Joseph Goebbels, Dosh — a Holocaust survivor — drew a proud, strong and sympathetic Jewish character. The journalist Shalom Rosenfeld, editor of Maariv in 1974–1980, wrote:

Handala
Srulik has been compared to Handala, the Palestinian national personification, and has appeared together with Handala in murals supporting the two-state solution.

See also
 Sabra (person)
 Culture of Israel
 Negation of the Diaspora

References

External links
 Srulik by Dosh, the official website
 שרוליק - הישראלי הנצחי ("Srulik - The Eternal Israeli"), on the website of the Ministry of Education of Israel 
 Srulik maximum card from Israel
 Another Srulik maximum card from Israel

National personifications
Fictional Israeli Jews
Israeli culture
National symbols of Israel